The Yulongyan Dam is an arch dam on the Gongxi River located  east of Hongjiang in Hunan Province, China. The primary purpose of the dam is hydroelectric power generation but it also provides flood control and water for irrigation. Construction initially began in 1992 but work was halted due to a lack of funding. In 2003 construction began again and the dam was complete in 2005 with the power station commissioned in 2006.

See also

List of dams and reservoirs in China

References

Dams in China
Hydroelectric power stations in Hunan
Arch dams
2005 establishments in China
Dams completed in 2005